Shahrak-e Bala may refer to:
 Shahrak-e Bala, East Azerbaijan
 Shahrak-e Bala, Kurdistan